Cloghamon Mill is a song dating from around 1815 in Wexford, Ireland. It describes a mill built near Newtownbarry (now Bunclody), though there are no known surviving records of such a mill.

Lyrics
You gods of brilliant genius that's endowed with elocution
And by versification have immortalized your name
Revive my drooping intellect, I crave a contribution
Of assistance while I harmonize with eloquence my theme
Forgive me not for rashness to attempt impossibilities
Though I am stimulated by a motive of goodwill
Though an inexperienced tyro in the dawn of native literature
I intend to state the praises of Cloghamon's brand new mill

This magnificent structure of divine architecture
We built in anno domini eighteen and sixteen
When by final perseverance it was brought to an accomplishment
Its like was seldom ever seen in Erin the green
To give a good idea about its spaciousness and symmetry
Is far beyond the limits of my feeble poet's pen
But in every direction tis a bulwark of perfection
Hibernia's boast and glory is Cloghamon's brand new mill

No wonder I should deem it an object of astonishment
When men of great discernment came from near and far
To view this lofty building, of which it is related
That it was prognosticated by a great fiery star
These grand configurations, the beauty of creation,
Was brought to calculation by astronomical skill
Twas perspicuously expounded and foretold there would be founded
Near the town of Newtonberry an admirable mill

Now the gentry of this country, for rural recreation,
The sweet meandering banks of the Slaney do serenade
Where the beauties of nature are arranged in true reality
And the white trout is abounding in each crystal cascade
When on this lofty building you feast your curiosity
And view each grand invention of artifice and skill
The critical machinery and curious elevation
Obtained great approbation for Cloghamon's brand new mill

See also
Traditional Irish Singers
Roud Folk Song Index

Irish songs
1810s songs
Year of song unknown
Songwriter unknown